Caffiers is a commune in the Pas-de-Calais department in the Hauts-de-France region of France.

Geography
A farming village located 10 miles (16 km) south of Calais, on the D250 road. Caffiers station is situated on the Boulogne-Calais railway.

Population

Places of interest
 The church of St. Eloi, dating from the nineteenth century.

See also
Communes of the Pas-de-Calais department

References

Communes of Pas-de-Calais